Bedelliidae is a small family of small, narrow-winged moths; most authorities recognize just a single genus, Bedellia, previously included in the family Lyonetiidae. The family is still included in the Lyonetiidae as the subfamily Bedelliinae by some authors.

Species

References

External links
Microleps U.S.A. (Nearctic)
Japmoth Images of imagines, larva and pupa

 
Moth genera
Taxa named by Henry Tibbats Stainton